Mia McKenzie is an American writer, activist, and the founder of the website Black Girl Dangerous (BGD). She grew up in Philadelphia, Pennsylvania, and attended the University of Pittsburgh. McKenzie identifies as a queer Black feminist and uses her writing and website to write about LGBTQ people of color. She is a recipient of the Lambda Literary Award for her debut novel, The Summer We Got Free, as well as her 2021 novel, Skye Falling. Her essays and short stories appear regularly on BGD as well as various publications, such as the Kenyon Review.

McKenzie presents talks that center on the intersections of race, class, queerness, and gender at universities and conferences across the United States She lives in Boston, Massachusetts.

Personal life and education 
Mia McKenzie was born and raised in Philadelphia. She grew up in a working-class family where the Christian church was important to family life. In an interview with Elixher magazine, McKenzie states: "I come from a family of churchgoers and I was raised going to church, and because of that I have a particular interest in and connection to the stories of Black church folk, and especially the ways in which incredible amounts of queerness and equal amounts of homophobia co-exist in Black churches." McKenzie studied writing at the University of Pittsburgh.

Lectures and appearances 
McKenzie has visited several universities, colleges, and conferences to speak on race, class, gender, queerness and their intersections. Brown University, Amherst College, Michigan State University, Portland State University, University of California at Berkeley, Penn State, Oberlin College, Reed College, Lawrence University, UC Santa Barbara, University of Oregon, Chapman University, and University of Washington are among the institutions where she has presented. In 2013 she gave a keynote address at Harvard University to the HBGC LGBTQ Youth Empowerment Conference.

Reception 
Mia McKenzie's work has been referenced on news sites such as Salon, HuffPost Black Voices, New Republic, and The Brown Daily Herald.  In her interview with Elixher, McKenzie talks about why she started Black Girl Dangerous:As Black women, we are always so cognizant of people’s perceptions of us, and always having to modify ourselves–our tones of voice, the language we use–to make other people feel less threatened by us. We are expected to accommodate anti-Black racism by not doing or saying anything that will scare white folks. In this way, we are asked to make racism easier for people. I got tired of being expected to do that. I decided that I would, instead, embrace my own dangerousness–remake it and reshape it and retell it–and use it as a tool of self-expression.

Awards and distinctions 
 Lambda Literary Award for The Summer We Got Free (2013)
 Leeway Foundation Transformation Award (2011)
 Astraea Foundation Writers Fund Award (2009)

Notable works 
 Black Girl Dangerous: On Race, Queerness, Class, and Gender. BGD Press. 2014
 "Crazy". McSweeney's Quarterly Concern, Issue 51. 2018
 "Illegitimate". The Kenyon Review. 2013
 "America only gets enraged about gun violence in white neighborhoods". The Guardian. April 29, 2013
 The Summer We Got Free. BGD Press. 2012

References

External links 
 https://web.archive.org/web/20150801215519/http://miamckenzie.net/
 https://twitter.com/miamckenzie
 https://twitter.com/blackgirldanger
 Black Girl Dangerous

21st-century American novelists
Activists from Philadelphia
African-American feminists
African-American novelists
American feminist writers
American women novelists
LGBT African Americans
American LGBT novelists
LGBT people from Pennsylvania
American LGBT rights activists
Lambda Literary Award for Debut Fiction winners
Living people
Queer feminists
Queer novelists
University of Pittsburgh alumni
Writers from Philadelphia
Year of birth missing (living people)
Novelists from Pennsylvania
21st-century American women writers
Queer women
21st-century African-American women writers
21st-century African-American writers